The ancient Greek city of Epidamnos or Epidamnus, later the Roman Dyrrachium (Δυρράχιον) (modern Durrës, Albania), was founded in 627 BC in Illyria by a group of colonists from Corinth and Corcyra (modern Corfu). Aristotle's Politics several times draws for examples on the internal government of Epidamnos, which was run as a tight oligarchy that appointed a ruling magistrate; tradesmen and craftsmen were excluded from power, until internal strife produced a more democratic government. The exiled oligarchs appealed to Corcyra while the democrats enlisted the help of Corinth, initiating a struggle between the two mother cities described by Thucydides as a cause of the Peloponnesian War. Individual trading with the local Illyrians was forbidden at Epidamnos: all traffic was through the authorized city agent or poletes. In the fourth century BC the city-state was part of the kingdoms of Cassander and Pyrrhus. The general vicinity of Epidamnus was called Epidamnia.

Etymology 
Etymologically, Epidamnos may be related to or derived from Proto-Albanian *dami (cub).

Dyrrhachium 
In 229 BC, when the Romans seized the city the "-damnos" part of the name was inauspicious to Latin ears (it resembles the Latin word damnum, meaning 'damage' or 'loss'), and its name, as it was refounded, became Dyrrhachium. Pausanias (6.x.8) says "the modern Roman city is not the ancient one, being at a short distance from it. The modern city is called Dyrrhachium from its founder." The name Dyrrachion is found on coins of the fifth century BC; in the Roman period Dyrrachium was more common. However, the city maintained a semi-autonomy and was turned into a Roman colony.

Dyrrachium was the landing place for Roman passengers crossing the Ionian Sea from Brundisium, which made it a fairly busy way-station. Here commenced the Via Egnatia, the Roman military road to Thessalonica that connected Roman Illyria with Macedonia and Thrace. The city itself was part of Macedonia, more specifically Epirus Nova. In 48 BC Pompey was based at Dyrrachium and beat off an attack by Julius Caesar. In AD 345 the city was levelled by an earthquake and rebuilt on its old foundations.

In the 4th century AD, Dyrrachium was made the capital of the Roman province of Epirus nova. Thus its Archbishopric became the Metropolitan of all dioceses in the province.

The name "Epidamnos" was still used by the Byzantines, as for example in the 13th-century Synopsis Chronike, referring to contemporary events.

See also
List of settlements in Illyria
Greek colonisation

References

External links
Perseus site: several sources, including William Smith, ed., Dictionary of Greek and Roman Geography (1854)

Roman sites in Albania
Populated places established in the 7th century BC
627 BC establishments
Hellenistic Albania
Corinthian colonies
Greek colonies in Illyria
Illyrian Albania
Durrës
Ancient Greek archaeological sites in Albania